Davis Airport  is a privately owned, public use airport located three nautical miles (6 km) north of the central business district of Laytonsville, in Montgomery County, Maryland, United States.

Facilities and aircraft 
Davis Airport covers an area of 20 acres (8 ha) at an elevation of 630 feet (192 m) above mean sea level. It has one runway designated 8/26 with an asphalt surface measuring 2,005 by 25 feet (611 x 8 m).

For the 12-month period ending May 5, 2011, the airport had 5,100 general aviation aircraft operations, an average of 13 per day. At that time there were 17 aircraft based at this airport, all single-engine.

References

External links 
 
 W50 - Davis Airport at the Maryland Aviation Administration
 Aerial image as of April 1993 from USGS The National Map
 

Airports in Maryland
Transportation buildings and structures in Montgomery County, Maryland